A ouija is a flat board purportedly used to communicate with the spirits of the deceased.

Ouija or Ouija Board may also refer to:

Film
 Ouija (2003 film), a 2003 horror film
 Ouija (2005 film), a 2005 Egyptian suspense movie
 Ouija (2007 film), a 2007 horror-thriller film
 Ouija (2014 film), a 2014 American horror film
 Ouija: Origin of Evil, a 2016 American horror prequel film to the 2014 film
 Ouija (2015 film), a 2015 Kannada horror film
 Ouija 3: The Charlie Charlie Challenge, a 2016 American horror film that was re-titled as an unofficial sequel to the 2014 film
 Ouija 4, a 2015 Hong Kong horror film that was re-titled as an unofficial sequel to the 2014 film
 Ouija Mummy, a 2019 American horror film

Other uses
 "Ouija Board, Ouija Board", a 1989 song by Morrissey
 Ouija Board (horse), a racehorse
 Ouija Board Handicap, an American thoroughbred horse race
 Ouija board, a replica of an aircraft carrier's flight and hangar decks used in modern United States Navy carrier air operations

See also

Ouya
Weegee (1899–1968), New York photojournalist
Seance, the category that ouija falls into when used to communicate with the dead
Board game, the category that ouija falls into when played for fun

Board (disambiguation)
Oui (disambiguation)
Ja (disambiguation)